Owor is a Ugandan surname. Notable people with the surname include:

 Paskar Owor (born 1980), Ugandan runner
 Raphael Owor (born 1934), Ugandan physician, pathologist, academic, and medical researcher
 Wilbrod Humphreys Owor (born 1966), Ugandan businessman

Surnames of African origin